The Men's 4x100m Freestyle Relay event at the 2007 Pan American Games occurred at the Maria Lenk Aquatic Park in Rio de Janeiro, Brazil, with the final being swum on July 20.

Medalists

Results

Finals

Preliminaries
The heats was held on July 19.

References
For the Record, Swimming World Magazine, September 2007 (p. 48+49)

Freestyle Relay, Men's 4x100